David José Vallenilla Luis ( 1995 – 22 June 2017) was a Venezuelan student killed during the 2017 Venezuelan protests.

Killing 

David Vallenilla was a graduate student in nursing. Son of David Vallenilla, who was the superior of Nicolás Maduro when he worked in the Caracas Metro. On 22 June 2017, Vallenilla was in a protest on the Francisco Fajardo highway, in Caracas, when a military official fired a shotgun at him from inside the La Carlota air base. He was wounded at the thorax level and was transferred to the El Ávila clinic, where he was admitted without vital signs at the age of 22.

On 13 July, a night march was summoned in honor of those killed during the protests, including Vallenilla, marching to the places where the demonstrators died. Dissident CICPC inspector Óscar Pérez made a surprise appearance in the march, before leaving and disappearing.

The killing of David Vallenilla was documented in a report by a panel of independent experts from the Organization of American States, considering that it could constitute a crime against humanity committed in Venezuela along with other killings during the protests.

See also 

 Armando Cañizales
 Miguel Castillo
 Paúl Moreno
 Jairo Ortiz
 Juan Pablo Pernalete
 Paola Ramírez
 Xiomara Scott
 Fabián Urbina
 Timeline of the 2017 Venezuelan protests

References 

1990s births
2017 deaths
Deaths by firearm in Venezuela
Deaths by person in Venezuela
Filmed killings
Male murder victims
People murdered in Venezuela
People shot dead by law enforcement officers
Victims of police brutality
Year of birth uncertain
2017 murders in Venezuela